The London Encyclopaedia, first published in 1983, is a 1100-page historical reference work on the United Kingdom's capital city, London. The encyclopaedia covers the Greater London area.

Development
The first edition of the encyclopaedia was compiled over a number of years by antiquarian bookseller Ben Weinreb and by the historian Christopher Hibbert, and was revised in 1993, 1995, and 2008. It has around 5,000 articles, supported by two indices—one general and one listing people, each of about 10,000 entries—and is published by Macmillan.

In 2012, an app was developed by Heuristic-Media, and released as London—A City Through Time. Toby Evetts and Simon Reeves, partners in Heuristic-Media, discussed the development of the app with The Guardian in 2013, describing how 4,500 entries had to be plotted onto a guide map by hand.

Antecedents
The encyclopaedia builds on a number of earlier publications, including:

Survey of London by John Stow, 1598.
The Survey of London — a multi-volume publication originated in 1894 by Charles Robert Ashbee, adopted first by the London County Council, then the Greater London Council, and now domiciled with English Heritage.
Handbook for London by Peter Cunningham, 1849.
London Past and Present by Wheatley and Peter Cunningham, 1891.

See also
 The Encyclopaedia of Oxford – also edited by Christopher Hibbert
 A London Encyclopaedia – a general encyclopaedia published in London in 1829

References

External links
The Survey of London at British History Online

1983 non-fiction books
1995 non-fiction books
2008 non-fiction books
British encyclopedias
Encyclopedias of history
History books about London
20th-century encyclopedias
21st-century encyclopedias